Sanrawat Dechmitr, formerly Wichaya Dechmitr, simply known as Camp is a Thai professional footballer who plays as a midfielder for Thai League 1 club Bangkok United and the Thailand national team.

International career
Sanrawat played for Thailand U23 in the 2010 Asian Games. In May 2015, he played for Thailand in the 2018 FIFA World Cup qualification (AFC) against Vietnam. In 2018 he was called up to the 2018 AFF Suzuki Cup.

Style of play
Sanrawat has a formidable passing ability. He was later moved to a deep-lying playmaker role by Alexandré Pölking. This position best utilised his attributes, and allowed him to operate creatively from a deeper position, in or even behind the main midfield line, in a seemingly defensive midfield role, where he was allowed more time on the ball to create scoring opportunities with his trademark long balls. He also had great coordination abilities, which was shown in the AFF cup where he provided many assists for Thailand.

Career statistics

Club

Honours

International
Thailand
 King's Cup (2): 2016, 2017
 AFF Championship: 2022

Individual
 Thai League 1 Player of the Month (1): August 2015
2018 AFF Championship: Best Eleven
 ASEAN Football Federation Best XI: 2019

References

External links
 
Sanrawat Dechmitr profile at the Bangkok United website

1989 births
Living people
Sanrawat Dechmitr
Sanrawat Dechmitr
Association football midfielders
Singapore Premier League players
Tampines Rovers FC players
Sanrawat Dechmitr
Sanrawat Dechmitr
Sanrawat Dechmitr
Sanrawat Dechmitr
Thai expatriate footballers
Thai expatriate sportspeople in Singapore
Expatriate footballers in Singapore
Sanrawat Dechmitr
Sanrawat Dechmitr
Footballers at the 2010 Asian Games
2019 AFC Asian Cup players
Sanrawat Dechmitr